The Kilbride Formation is a geologic formation in Ireland. It preserves fossils dating back to the Silurian period.

See also

 List of fossiliferous stratigraphic units in Ireland

References
 

Geologic formations of Ireland
Silurian System of Europe
Silurian Ireland
Silurian southern paleotropical deposits